Coup by Memorandum may refer to:

1971 Turkish coup d'état
1997 Turkish coup d'état (the "Postmodern coup")